José "Cheo" Hernández (born 1894) was a Cuban League and Negro leagues pitcher, who also spent time for several Minor League Baseball teams in a career that spanned 1915 to 1927.

References

External links
 and Baseball-Reference Black Baseball stats and Seamheads

Almendares (baseball) players
Habana players
Cuban Stars (West) players
San Francisco Park players
1894 births
Year of death missing